Angelo Esmael da Costa Júnior (born 12 November 1983) is a Brazilian former professional footballer who played as a goalkeeper. He was known as Júnior Costa in Brazil, and as Angelo Da Costa (or simply Da Costa) in Italy and the UEFA Champions League.

Career

Santo André
Da Costa played 8 out of 11 2004 Copa do Brasil matches, ahead Júlio César Martins.

He signed an improved contract with Santo André of Brasileiro Série B in April 2005, which run until December 2008. At the 2005 Copa Libertadores he was Júlio César Martins' backup, except in one game against Cerro Porteño.

He was the backup keeper for Marcelo Bonan at 2006 Campeonato Brasileiro Série B. He made his league debut on 25 August 2006, replacing Bonan in the 23rd minute.

Varese & Ancona
In January 2008 da Costa left for Italian Serie C2 side Varese.

During the summer of 2008, he signed for Ancona for an undisclosed fee.

Sampdoria
Da Costa was given permission to negotiate with Sampdoria in July, days before the expel of Ancona from professional league due to financial regulation. He became the second keeper of the team, behind another new signing, Gianluca Curci, as the team released Luca Castellazzi, Matteo Guardalben, sold Antonio Mirante, did not buy Mario Cassano and failed to buy Marco Storari. He was assigned shirt number 1 previously owned by Castellazzi and made his first start in Serie A on 8 May 2011, the Derby della Lanterna. That match was the second last match of round 36 (and was the third last round); Lecce had already secured three points before the kick off of the derby and eventually Samp lost 1–2 through a late goal by Mauro Boselli. Sampdoria dropped into the relegation zone by two points short with Lecce. In the next round he remained as starting keeper, as Curci remained unfit, He conceded two goals, the first by Lecce native Fabrizio Miccoli as Samp lost to Palermo 1–2 and were relegated, while Lecce won the local derby against Bari.

Da Costa played 15 games in 2011–12 Serie B. Initially the backup of Sergio Romero, he was made first-choice goalkeeper after Romero's injury. In the promotion playoffs, Romero was on international duty and missed the first rounds, and da Costa played the matches contributing to a win against Sassuolo. Romero temporarily returned to Samp for the first leg of the finals on 6 June, however Romero left again for the return leg. Da Costa once again became first-choice goalkeeper for the return leg in Varese's Stadio Franco Ossola.

Bologna
On 20 January 2015, da Costa signed with Bologna F.C. 1909. On 8 July 2015, he signed a new three-year contract.

Career statistics

Note
1 Three matches in the promotion playoffs

Honours
Copa do Brasil: 2004

State
Copa Estado de São Paulo: 2003

Youth
Taça São Paulo de Juniores: 2003

References

External links
Profile at futpedia 
http://www.gazzetta.it/speciali/2008/calcio/Players/player_p210863.shtml
http://www.gazzetta.it/speciali/risultati_classifiche/calcio/giocatori/giocatore_junior_angelo_esmael_da_costa_272431852.shtml

1983 births
Living people
People from São Bernardo do Campo
Association football goalkeepers
Brazilian footballers
Brazilian expatriate footballers
Campeonato Brasileiro Série B players
Esporte Clube Santo André players
Serie A players
Serie B players
Expatriate footballers in Italy
S.S.D. Varese Calcio players
A.C. Ancona players
U.C. Sampdoria players
Bologna F.C. 1909 players
Brazilian expatriate sportspeople in Italy
Footballers from São Paulo (state)